The Kane County Dawgs were a professional indoor American football team based in Kane County, Illinois. The team joined the Continental Indoor Football League in 2013 as an expansion team. The Dawgs were one of three indoor football teams based in the Chicago metropolitan area. The Chicago Rush of the Arena Football League are based in Rosemont, and the Chicago Slaughter of the Indoor Football League are based in Hoffman Estates. The CIFL has had the Chicago Pythons (in 2012) which replaced the Chicago Knights (in 2011), formerly the Chicago Cardinals (in 2010), as the Illinois-based CIFL team, which replaced the Slaughter after they left for the Indoor Football League after a dispute with CIFL management. The Owners of the Dawgs are Mike Dortch and Macey Brooks. The Dawgs played their home games at the Seven Bridges Ice Arena in 2013.

Franchise history

2013

The franchise was originally to be called the DeKalb Dawgs, and were to play in the American Professional Football League in 2013, before announcing that they would be joining the Continental Indoor Football League as its tenth member in October 2012. On October 10, 2012, the franchise announced that former National Football League and Arena Football League player Matt Griebel was named the team's first head coach. The team also announced that they would be playing their home games at the Canlan Ice Sports Arena in Romeoville, Illinois. In November 2012, former NFL wide receiver, Macey Brooks joined the Dawgs with an ownership interest in the team, and will also serve as the team's wide receivers coach.

After having the first two weeks of the season off with bye weeks, the Dawgs forfeited their first game, when the turf they purchased did not adequately fit the Seven Bridges Ice Arena. The following week, the Dawgs would lose their first ever played game in franchise history, with a 13-69 loss to the Erie Explosion.

The loss to the Explosion, would end up being the team's only game, as the following week the league announced on their website that the Dawgs franchise was "indefinitely suspending operations" to protect the integrity of the league. Players and coaches were all released and free to sign with other teams in the CIFL or elsewhere.

Final roster

Coaches of note

Head coaches
Note: Statistics are correct through Week 3 of the 2013 Continental Indoor Football League season.

Coaching staff

Season-by-season results

References

External links
Kane County Dawgs official website

 
American football teams in Chicago
Former Continental Indoor Football League teams
Sports in Kane County, Illinois
American football teams established in 2012
American football teams disestablished in 2013
2012 establishments in Illinois
2013 disestablishments in Illinois